Neohepialiscus is a monotypic moth genus of the family Hepialidae. The only described species is N. algeriensis of Algeria and Tunisia.

References

External links
Hepialidae genera

Hepialidae
Monotypic moth genera
Taxa named by Pierre Viette
Exoporia genera
Moths of Africa